The Temecula massacre took place in December 1846 east of present-day Temecula, California, United States. It was part of a series of related events in the Mexican–American War.  A combined force of Californio militia and Cahuilla Indians attacked and killed an estimated 33 to 40 Luiseño Indians. The Mexican authorities in California took the military action in retaliation for the Indians' killing 11 Californio lancers, in what was called the Pauma Massacre.

Background
In a conflict that was part of the Mexican–American War, in the Battle of San Pasqual on December 6, 1846, Andrés Pico led a force of Californios against the United States. Soon after, a small group of the Mexican/Californio lancers requisitioned horses from the Pauma band for the war. The Luiseño Indians murdered the eleven Californios from Pico's forces in retaliation, in what became known as the Pauma Massacre. When the Mexican General José María Flores in Los Angeles learned about this challenge to Mexican authority, he sent José del Carmen Lugo from San Bernardino with a force of men to capture and execute the tribal leaders responsible.

Events
While en route to the Temecula Valley, Lugo encountered Chief Juan Antonio, leader of a group of Cahuilla Indians, who joined his forces.  The two groups set up camp along the Santa Gertrudis Creek.  Lugo was to wait for reinforcements from Los Angeles.  Learning that José Ramón Carrillo and a group of men were at the Mission San Luis Rey de Francia, Lugo requested him to provide assistance.  Carrillo and his men joined Lugo and Chief Antonio.  Word reached the Temecula village that Californios from Los Angeles were headed to the valley.  The Luiseño went east into the canyon and hid.

Lugo sent a few men to find the Luiseño warriors.  The men reported back that the Luiseños were hiding.  Lugo knew if his men went into the canyon they would be trapped, so he decided to draw the Luiseño out of hiding and into his own trap. Just west of the canyon was a small meadow with rolling hills on either side.  The Cahuilla took position on one hill, and Lugo set his men on the other. Carrillo and his men went into the canyon, where they feigned fatigue. Young Indian warriors thought they saw an opportunity to take the Californios.  The chiefs tried to calm them, but the warriors attacked the Californios.

Carrillo and his men fled from the canyon into the meadow, pulling the warriors in pursuit.  Once the war party was in the meadow, the Cahuilla and Lugo's men attacked the Luisenos, and Carrillo's men turned and attacked as well. Many warriors were killed; others surrendered.  A few warriors escaped and headed toward Aguanga.

Lugo turned over the captives to the Cahuilla, their traditional enemy. Lugo and a few men pursued the escaped Indians.  When Lugo returned, Chief Antonio had already killed all the prisoners.  The Californios and the Cahuilla regrouped at their campsite.  Another group of soldiers, led by Diego Sepúlveda, joined Lugo at the campsite.  Sepúlveda's men had been delayed joining Lugo.

During the aftermath of the massacre, the Mormon Battalion passed through Temecula. The Mormons stood guard to prevent further bloodshed while the Luiseño people gathered their dead into a common grave.

See also
 List of massacres in California

References

 
 Horace Parker, The Historic Valley of Temecula.  The Temecula Massacre, Paisano Press.
  .

External links
 City of Temecula: "Temecula Massacre" by Anne J. Miller; and, "A Look Back: The Temecula Massacre", February 6, 2010, by Vanessa Eddeling, Special to The Press-Enterprise
 "The Temecula Massacre", California and the Indian Wars, The California State Military Museum
 

Cahuilla
Battles of the Conquest of California
Massacres by Native Americans
Massacres of Native Americans
Cemeteries in Riverside County, California
Native American history of California
1846 in Alta California
Temecula, California
December 1846 events
California genocide